Mary A. Gillen (October 8, 1894 – September 14, 1963) was an American politician from New York.

Life
She was born Mary Agnes Burke on October 8, 1894, the daughter of Michael Burke (1856–1912) and Anne Bridget (O'Gara) Burke (1858–1906). On February 4, 1917, she married Michael J. Gillen (1885–1942), and they had several children.

Her husband was a member of the New York State Assembly (Kings Co., 3rd D.) from 1926 until his death on February 1, 1942. On February 16, she was nominated to run at a special election to fill the vacancy caused by her husband's death. On March 10, 1942, she was elected to the 163rd New York State Legislature. On March 13, she took her seat for the last six weeks of the legislative session. She was re-elected several times and remained in the State Assembly until 1956, sitting in the 164th, 165th, 166th, 167th, 168th, 169th and 170th New York State Legislatures. In November 1956, she ran for re-election but was defeated by Republican Harry J. Donnelly

She died on September 14, 1963, in St. Mary's Hospital in Brooklyn; and was buried at the Holy Cross Cemetery there.

Sources

External links
 

1894 births
1963 deaths
Politicians from Brooklyn
Democratic Party members of the New York State Assembly
Burials at Holy Cross Cemetery, Brooklyn
Women state legislators in New York (state)
20th-century American politicians
20th-century American women politicians